Dichotomyctere is a genus of relatively small pufferfish found in both fresh and brackish waters in south and southeast Asia. Its species were generally included in the genus Tetraodon until 2013.

Species
There are currently 6 species in the genus:

 Dichotomyctere erythrotaenia  — Red-striped toadfish
 Dichotomyctere fluviatilis  — Green pufferfish
 Dichotomyctere kretamensis 
 Dichotomyctere nigroviridis  — Spotted green pufferfish
 Dichotomyctere ocellatus  — Eyespot pufferfish
 Dichotomyctere sabahensis

References

Tetraodontidae
Ray-finned fish genera
Taxa named by André Marie Constant Duméril